Battleford—Kindersley was a federal electoral district (riding) n Saskatchewan, Canada, that was represented in the House of Commons of Canada from 1968 to 1979.

This riding was created in 1966 from parts of Kindersley, The Battlefords and Rosetown—Biggar ridings.

It was abolished in 1976 when it was redistributed into Kindersley—Lloydminster and The Battlefords—Meadow Lake ridings.

Election results

See also 

 List of Canadian federal electoral districts
 Past Canadian electoral districts

Sources 
 

Former federal electoral districts of Saskatchewan